Rupert Crosse (November 29, 1927 – March 5, 1973) was an American television and film actor noted as the first African American to receive a nomination for a Best Supporting Actor Academy Award — for his role in the 1969 adaptation of William Faulkner's The Reivers.

Background 
Born Robert A. Crosse, Jr. in New York City, Crosse was raised by his grandparents in Nevis after the death of his father. He returned to the United States to serve in the Army for two years before entering Bloomfield College. Crosse later worked at Brooklyn College as a counselor.

In 1970, Crosse married singer Chris Calloway, daughter of Cab Calloway. They had one son, Rupert Osaze Dia Crosse, who was nine months old at the time of Crosse's death. Their son died in 2002 from a heart condition brought on by prior drug abuse. Calloway died of breast cancer in August 2008.

Crosse died  March 5, 1973, of lung cancer in Nevis.

Career
After studying acting under John Cassavetes, Crosse appeared in two of Cassavetes' films: Shadows (for which he won a Venice Film Festival Award) and Too Late Blues (1962).

A life member of The Actors Studio, Crosse made numerous guest appearances on television in the decade prior to landing the role of Ned McCaslin in the 1969 film The Reivers, directed by and starring fellow Studio members Mark Rydell and Steve McQueen, respectively. His last onscreen role was in the sitcom The Partners, alongside Don Adams. Shortly before his death, Crosse was cast as Mulhall in The Last Detail (1973), withdrawing from the role after learning he suffered from terminal cancer.

Filmography

References

External links 
 

1927 births
1973 deaths
20th-century American male actors
Male actors from New York City
American male film actors
American people of Saint Kitts and Nevis descent
Deaths from cancer in Saint Kitts and Nevis
Deaths from lung cancer
United States Army soldiers
African-American male actors
American male television actors
Bloomfield College alumni
20th-century African-American people